CJPP may refer to

Canadian Journal of Physiology and Pharmacology
Canadian Journal of Plant Pathology
CJPP-FM, a low-power tourist radio station in Point Pelee, Ontario